Mushanga (also Romanized as Mūshangā; also known as Mūshangā Bālā and Mūshankā) is a village in Saravan Rural District, Sangar District, Rasht County, Gilan Province, Iran. At the 2006 census, its population was 273 with 79 families.

References 

Populated places in Rasht County